Alexander Mordukhovich (born March 28, 1946), is a composer and musician from Russia.

See also
Music of Russia

References

External links
 Website of Alexander Mordukhovich

1946 births
Living people
Jewish classical composers
Russian classical composers
Russian Jews
Russian male classical composers
Soviet classical composers
Soviet male classical composers
20th-century Russian male musicians
Place of birth missing (living people)